Elisabeth Valle (born 10 February 1978) is a Spanish gymnast. She competed at the 1996 Summer Olympics.

References

External links
 

1978 births
Living people
Spanish female artistic gymnasts
Olympic gymnasts of Spain
Gymnasts at the 1996 Summer Olympics
Gymnasts from Barcelona
20th-century Spanish women